Toimi Olavi Kankaanniemi (born 26 February 1950) is a Finnish politician, born in Tyrvää. Kankaanniemi was the Chairman of the Finnish Christian Democrats from 1989 to 1995. In 1994, he was a candidate for President of Finland, finishing ninth of eleven candidates. He served as a Member of the Finnish Parliament from 1987 to 2011. Kankaanniemi was also a minister in the cabinet of Esko Aho from 1991 to 1994, responsible for international development as well as alcohol issues. He resigned from the cabinet in 1994, citing his opposition to the European Union, which Finland was about to join.

After retiring from the Parliament Kankaanniemi resigned his membership in the Christian Democrats and, in 2012, joined the Finns Party (True Finns) as a candidate in that year's municipal election. He became a member of the Finns Party the following year. He was a candidate in the 2014 European Parliament election, but was not elected.

In the 2015 parliamentary election Kankaanniemi returned to the parliament as a Finns Party MP. After admitting to sending sexually suggestive messages over Facebook to several women, Kankaanniemi was removed from the Finns Party's government negotiation team.

References

|-

|-

1950 births
Living people
People from Sastamala
Christian Democrats (Finland) politicians
Finns Party politicians
Government ministers of Finland
Members of the Parliament of Finland (1987–91)
Members of the Parliament of Finland (1991–95)
Members of the Parliament of Finland (1995–99)
Members of the Parliament of Finland (1999–2003)
Members of the Parliament of Finland (2003–07)
Members of the Parliament of Finland (2007–11)
Members of the Parliament of Finland (2015–19)
Members of the Parliament of Finland (2019–23)
University of Tampere alumni